Elisabeth Sakellariou (born April 1939) is a Greek architect.

Early life
Elisabeth Sakellariou is the daughter of Perikles A. Sakellario, also a Greek architect. She trained at the Architectural Association School of Architecture (1958-1963) and at Saint Martin's School of Art (1957 -1960) in London.

Career 
In 1963 Sakellariou worked in Athens. From 1964 to 1965 she worked in Paris for Georges Candilis on urban and tourist developments in Corsica. In 1966, Sakellariou returned to Greece and until 1973 worked at P. A. Sakellarios and Associates as a partner, alongside H.E. Senkowsky and Koula Kampani. Sakellario married Austrian architect H. E. Senkowsky in 1966. 

Sakellariou was the founding member of the firm ARSY Co. She specialized in hospital design. During this period Sakellariou was also the Greek correspondent for the magazine L’Architecture d’Aujourd’hui. 

In 1973 she and her husband set up their own practice under the name Senkowsky-Sakellarios, Architects and Town Planners. Sakellariou has been a member of the Hellenic Architectural Society since 1968, and is a founding member of the Lykeion ton Hellinidon in Bonn, Germany, where she served as President from 1997 to 2001.

Buildings
In collaboration with Sakellarios, Senkowsky, Kampani:

 1967 - 1972 	Corfu International Airport
 1968 - 1970	Extension to the Hotel Corfu Palace, Corfu
 1969 - 1970	Greek Pavilion in the Osaka World Fair EXPO 70
 1969 - 1971 	National Bank of Greece, Corfu
 1972 - 1974	Office and Printing -Press complex for the Athens Newspapers, Apoyevmatini and Akropolis

As a partner together with H. E. Senkowsky:

 1972 - 1974	Restoration and new building complex in Agia Pelagia Estate, Corfu
 1974 - 1978	Restoration and additions to Villa Fontana Estate, Corfu
 1974 - 1976	Farm house in Peloponnese (Earned Award for Habitation Space 1974)
 1975 - 1976	Nana Mouskouri’s house, Corfu. (Earned Award for Habitation Space 1978)
 1977 - 1979	Office Building, “Stoa Pappou”,  Athens.
 1990 - 1993	Consulting and supervising the German Embassy in Athens

Books

Ελληνική Αρχιτεκτονική Εταιρεία Αρχιτέκτονες του 20ου Αιώνα, Ελένη Φεσσά-Εμμανουήλ POTAMOS Publishers

References

1939 births
Living people
Greek women architects
Alumni of Saint Martin's School of Art
Alumni of the Architectural Association School of Architecture
20th-century Greek architects
21st-century Greek architects